Three ships of the Japanese Navy have been named Hashidate:

 , a  launched in 1891 and scrapped in 1927
 , a  launched in 1939 and sunk in 1944
 , an accommodation ship launched in 1999 and in active service as of 2020.

Imperial Japanese Navy ship names
Japanese Navy ship names